This is a list of electoral results for the Electoral district of Altona in Victorian state elections from 1992 to the present.

Members for Altona

Election results

Elections in the 2010s

Elections in the 2000s

Elections in the 1990s

References

 

Victoria (Australia) state electoral results by district